Group C of the 2004 Fed Cup Europe/Africa Zone Group I was one of four pools in the Europe/Africa Zone Group I of the 2004 Fed Cup. Three teams competed in a round robin competition, with the top two teams advancing to the advancement play-offs and the bottom team being relegated down to the relegation play-offs.

Belarus vs. Denmark

Hungary vs. Denmark

Belarus vs. Hungary

See also
Fed Cup structure

References

External links
 Fed Cup website

2004 Fed Cup Europe/Africa Zone